The Bible translations into the languages of Taiwan are into Taiwanese, Hakka, Amis, and other languages of Taiwan.

Chinese

In Taiwan, education from kindergarten to college is done in Mandarin Chinese. Chinese is used in government offices and large corporations. The Bible text in Chinese is in Traditional Chinese, written vertically, rather than in Simplified Chinese, written horizontally.

Taiwanese
The majority of the Taiwan people speak at home Taiwanese, sometimes called Taiwanese Hokkien or Min Nan Yu because their ancestors came from the southern part of China's Fujian Province. In 1916, Thomas Barclay finished the New Testament translation into Taiwanese Hokkien, followed by the Old Testament translation using Latin script in 1930. His entire NT/OT Bible, now called Amoy Romanized Bible, was published in 1933. The copies of this translation was once confiscated by the Taiwan Garrison Command during the martial law era for "obstructing of the Kuo-yu policy". In 1996, this Bible was put into the Chinese characters, called Taiwanese Han Character Bible.

The translation of Taiwanese Bible: Today's Taiwanese Version using Latin and Han script is already complete for the New Testament with Psalms and Proverbs, the remaining books of Old Testament are under going translation. The revision was completed at late 2021.

Hakka
The Hakka people live mainly in Taiwan's northwest areas, such as Taoyuan City, Hsinchu County and Miaoli County. The Hakka language is one of the four languages (the other three being Mandarin Chinese, Taiwanese and English) heard in the public transportation announcement in Taipei. Bible translation into Hakka language started in 1984. In 1993, the New Testament with the Psalms in Hakka was published, followed by the publication in 2012 of Hakka Bible: Today's Taiwan Hakka Version.

Amis
The Amis people, living in Taiwan's east coast (Hualien, Taitung County and Pintung Counties), are the largest group among the Taiwanese indigenous peoples. In 1957, the Book of John was translated into Amis language using Bopomofo. After 1963, translation proceeded using Pinyin, and the New and Old Testaments in Amis were published in 1997. A revised version of New Testament with Psalms and Proverbs was published in 2019.

Other languages
The Bible translations into other languages of Taiwan are done or being done: Paiwan language (New Testament/part of OT in 1993), Bunun language (NT in 1983; part of Old Testament in 2000), Atayal language (NT using Bopomofo in 1974; Romanized NT/part of OT in 2003; Complete Romanized text in 2022), Truku language (NT in 1960; NT/OT in 2005), Tao/Yami Language (NT in 1994; OT in progress), Rukai (NT in 2001; NT/OT in 2017), Tsou language (NT in 2013; OT in progress), Seediq language (NT/OT in 2020).

See also
Bible translations
Ethnicity of Taiwan
Religion in Taiwan
Catholic Church in Taiwan

References

External links
Bible Society of Taiwan (in Chinese)
Chinese and Taiwanese Bibles (Bible Society in Japanese) (in Japanese)

Taiwan
Christianity in Taiwan
Protestantism in Taiwan
Catholic Church in Taiwan
Amis people
Taiwanese culture